Center of pressure may refer to:

Center of pressure (fluid mechanics)
Center of pressure (terrestrial locomotion)